Emmett "Scotty" Bowman (August, 1885 – February 28, 1912) was an American baseball player in the Negro leagues. The brother of fellow Negro leaguer George Bowman, he played from 1904 to 1911 with several teams.

References

External links

1885 births
1912 deaths
Cuban X-Giants players
Chicago American Giants players
Brooklyn Royal Giants players
Philadelphia Giants players
20th-century African-American people
Baseball pitchers